Founded in 1941, the Thoreau Society is the oldest and largest organization dedicated to an American author. It is based in Concord, Massachusetts, United States, at the house where Henry David Thoreau was born in 1817. With members from all 50 states and countries around the world, the Society disseminates knowledge about Thoreau by collecting books, manuscripts, and artifacts relating to Thoreau and his contemporaries, by encouraging the use of its extensive collections, and by publishing two periodicals, the Thoreau Society Bulletin and the Concord Saunterer.

The Thoreau Society archives are housed at the Walden Woods Project's Thoreau Institute Library in Lincoln, Massachusetts. This repository includes the collections of Walter Harding and Raymond Adams, two of the foremost authorities on Thoreau and founders of the Thoreau Society; and those of Roland W. Robbins, who uncovered Thoreau's Walden house site.

Mission 
To stimulate interest in and foster education about Thoreau's life, works, and philosophy and his place in his world and ours,
To encourage research on Thoreau's life and writings,
To act as a repository for Thoreauviana and material relevant to Thoreau,
And to advocate for the preservation of Thoreau Country.

Members 

Thoreau Society members represent a broad range of professions, interests, and hometowns across the United States and around the world. They are connected by the conviction that Thoreau had important things to say and crucial questions to ask that are just as significant now as in Thoreau's lifetime.

Through its programs, publications and projects, The Thoreau Society is committed to preserving Thoreau's legacy and encouraging people to think about how they live their lives.

Activities

Annual gathering
Four days of indoor and outdoor sessions and excursions in and around Concord focused on a different theme each year. The Thursday–Sunday program is scheduled in early July.

Educational programs
Lectures, classes, and performances in Thoreau's hometown of Concord, often in collaboration with other historical, literary, environmental and educational organizations.

Excursions 

Trips to places associated with Thoreau, from half-day hikes to multi-day outings. Past locations have included Mount Katahdin, Cape Cod, Harpers Ferry, Mount Monadnock and Concord sites such as Egg Rock, Fairhaven Bay, Gowing's Swamp and Sleepy Hollow Cemetery.

Presentations 
At academic conferences (the Modern Language Association and the American Literature Association have two annual sessions at their conferences each devoted to Thoreau) and at workshops for educators and the general public in Concord and beyond.

Projects and events 
Coordinated by members, Thoreau Society projects and events take place in communities across the country and around the world.

Publications

Thoreau Society Bulletin 
A quarterly publication with Society news, additions to the Thoreau bibliography, and short articles on Thoreau and related topics. Edited by Brent Ranalli.

Concord Saunterer 
An annual scholarly journal featuring in-depth essays on Thoreau, his times and his contemporaries, and his influence today. Edited by John J. Kucich.

Books 
The Society publishes and sponsors the publication of original Thoreau-related books and reprints of selected hard-to-find titles about Thoreau.

The collections 
The Thoreau Society owns several important collections, including the papers of Walter Harding, Raymond Adams, and Roland Robbins, which are housed at the Thoreau Institute at Walden Woods. This research facility, founded through a collaboration between the Walden Woods Project and The Thoreau Society, is managed by the Walden Woods Project.

References

External links 
 Official Site

Literary societies
Henry David Thoreau
Arts organizations established in 1941
Non-profit organizations based in Massachusetts